Frederick Taylor University (FTU) is an unaccredited, formerly state-approved private institution of higher learning located in Orange, California, currently offering resident and nonresident certificates in business, as well as undergraduate and graduate degrees in Christian leadership.

History and academics
Frederick Taylor University was established in 1994 to cater to mature adult learners, 20 years or older. The university previously offered undergraduate and graduate distance education programs in business leading to either a bachelor's or master's degree.

FTU currently offers both resident and nonresident programs leading to various certificates in business, as well as a bachelor's, master's, and doctorate in Christian leadership. Secular degrees are no longer offered; religious degree granting institutions are typically exempt from the state-approval process, but the school mentions on its website that the eligibility for exempt status has not been verified by the California Bureau of Private Postsecondary Education (BPPE).

Change of control and ownership on February 15, 2017

After grant of approval by the Bureau for Private Postsecondary Education (BPPE) for change of ownership/control, the university was acquired by The Vines Branches Transformation Company, a corporation based in City of Orange in Southern California.

Approval and accreditation status
Frederick Taylor University was formerly approved to operate by the California Bureau for Private Postsecondary Education (BPPE) and did appear on the California Postsecondary Education Commission (CPEC) list of state-approved institutions. That authorization was from the California Bureau for Private Postsecondary and Vocational Education (BPPVE), a predecessor agency of the Bureau for Private Postsecondary Education (BPPE). The BPPE conducted two site visits to FTU in May 2012 and April 2014

On September 19, 2017, FTU's state approval was suspended.
The school no longer appears on the BPPE's directory of approved institutions

FTU is currently not accredited by any accreditation body recognized by U.S. education authorities.

References

External links
Frederick Taylor University website

Distance education institutions based in the United States
Education in Contra Costa County, California
Unaccredited institutions of higher learning in California
Educational institutions established in 1994
1994 establishments in California